Secret Garden may refer to:

Literature
 The Secret Garden, 1911 novel by Frances Hodgson Burnett, which spawned several adaptations:
 The Secret Garden (1919 film), directed by Gustav von Seyffertitz
 The Secret Garden (1949 film), starring Dean Stockwell and Margaret O'Brien
 The Secret Garden (1987 film), a Hallmark Hall of Fame TV movie
 The Secret Garden (musical), a 1989 Broadway musical with music by Lucy Simon
 Anime Himitsu no Hanazono, a 1991 anime series with 39 episodes which adapts the story
 The Secret Garden (1993 film), a movie directed by Agnieszka Holland
 The Secret Garden (1994 film), an animated adaptation produced by DIC Entertainment, Greengrass Productions, and Kalisto Ltd.
 The Secret Garden (2020 film), a fantasy film directed by Marc Munden
 The Secret Garden (opera), 2013 opera by Nolan Gasser
 "The Secret Garden", a short story by G. K. Chesterton featuring his Father Brown character
Secret Garden: An Inky Treasure Hunt and Colouring Book, 2013 coloring book for adults by Johanna Basford

Music
 Secret Garden (duo), an Irish-Norwegian duo playing new-age instrumental music
 Secret Garden Party, a music festival in Cambridgeshire, England

Albums
 Secret Garden (album), 2014 album by Angra
 Secret Garden (Apink EP), 2013 EP by Apink
 Secret Garden (Oh My Girl EP), 2018 EP by Oh My Girl

Songs
 "The Secret Garden (Sweet Seduction Suite)", a 1990 single by Quincy Jones
 "Secret Garden" (Bruce Springsteen song), 1995
 "Secret Garden" (T'Pau song), 1988
 "Secret Garden" (Gackt song), 2000
 "Secret Garden", by the Vels from Velocity, 1984
 "Secret Garden", by Madonna from Erotica, 1992
 "Secret Garden", by Patrick Wolf from The Magic Position, 2007
 "Secret Garden", by Spiritbox from Eternal Blue, 2021
 "Secret Garden" (Oh My Girl song), 2018

Television
 The Secret Garden (1960 TV series) in UK
 The Secret Garden (UK TV series), 1975 BBC TV serial starring Sarah Hollis Andrews and Hope Johnstone
 Secret Garden (South Korean TV series), a 2010 South Korean fantasy drama
 Secret Garden (Singaporean TV series), a 2010 Singaporean drama
 "Secret Garden" (Once Upon a Time), an episode of the seventh season of Once Upon a Time

Other uses
 Secret garden (gardening), a therapeutic or sanctuary garden style
 Secret Garden (outdoor nursery), a playschool in the woods of Letham, Fife, Scotland
 Secret Garden (Big Brother), a secret room used in Big Brother (UK) series 6